Mary Peters may refer to:

 Mary Peters (athlete) (born 1939), Northern Irish athlete
 Mary Peters (hymn writer) (1813–1856), British hymn writer
 Mary Peters (1852–1921), indigenous Oregon woman and ferry operator
 Mary E. Peters (born 1948), American politician, 15th United States Secretary of Transportation
 Mary Peters Fieser (1909–1997), née Mary Peters, American chemist
 Mary Ann Peters (born 1951), American ambassador to Bangladesh
 Mary Ann Peters (artist) (born 1949), American artist

See also
 Mary (disambiguation)
 Peters (disambiguation)